KELT-10, also known as CD−47°12635, is a sun-like star in the southern constellation Telescopium. It has an apparent magnitude of 10.62, making it readily visible in telescopes, but not to the naked eye.

KELT-10 has a stellar classification of G0 V, indicating that it is a yellow dwarf like the Sun. However, the object is 7% more massive and 21% larger. The star has a similar age, with an age of 4.5 billion years and more luminous, having a luminosity 40% greater. KELT-10's iron abundance is 123% that of the Sun, consistent with a planetary host. However, this amount is poorly constrained.

Planetary System 
In 2015, a "hot Jupiter" orbiting the star was discovered by the KELT-South telescope. KELT-10b orbits at a distance 10 time closer than Mercury orbits the Sun, and is bloated due to its orbit.

References 

G-type main-sequence stars
Telescopium (constellation)
TIC objects
Planetary systems with one confirmed planet
Durchmusterung objects